Bolesław Banaś (17 March 1912 – 24 September 1991) was a Polish fencer. He competed in the team épée and individual and team sabre events at the 1948 Summer Olympics.

References

1912 births
1991 deaths
Polish male fencers
Olympic fencers of Poland
Fencers at the 1948 Summer Olympics
Sportspeople from Łódź
People from Piotrków Governorate
20th-century Polish people